The 1862 Oregon gubernatorial election took place on June 2, 1862 to elect the governor of the U.S. state of Oregon. The election matched Republican Addison Crandall Gibbs against Democratic former member of the Territorial Legislature John F. Miller. Gibbs defeated Miller in a landslide.

Results

References

Gubernatorial
1862
Oregon
June 1862 events